Eupithecia pippa is a moth in the family Geometridae. It is found in Peru.

The wingspan is about 25 mm for males. The forewings are brownish in the posterior half and red-brownish distally. The hindwings are uniform smoky coloured.

References

Moths described in 1916
pippa
Moths of South America